Ipswich City Football Club is a football club from Ipswich, Brisbane, Queensland, Australia.  It currently competes in  Football Brisbane – Capital League. "The Bulls" local rivals are Ipswich Knights and Western Spirit. The club formed in 1975 with five teams and 70 players, drawn from all parts of Ipswich City, although most of them come from Leichhardt and the Brassall area.

The intention was to provide an avenue for people living in the north western side of Ipswich to compete in Football. The Club headquartered at Sutton Park, entered the Brisbane Junior Football Association competition for the first time in 1975. The first three years saw an increase in player numbers to two ladies teams, 15 junior and one colts (senior division) team and about 200 players.

Their greatest ever player, Norbert Duga "The Angry Hungarian", is currently the club's first team coach. He retired as a player after a very decorated career that included lifting the Brisbane Division 2 Premiership and Grand Final trophies in 2009.

External links

Soccer clubs in Brisbane
1975 establishments in Australia